The 1925 Dartmouth Indians football team was an American football team that represented Dartmouth College as an independent during the 1925 college football season. In its third season under head coach Jesse Hawley, the team compiled an 8–0 record, shut out five of eight opponents, and outscored all opponents by a total of 340 to 29. The team was designated as 1925 national champions by the Dickinson System and were awarded the Rissman Trophy after its creation the next year. They were also retroactively named champions by Parke H. Davis in the 1934 edition of Spalding's Foot Ball Guide.

Dartmouth's 1925 season was part of a 22-game unbeaten streak that began in November 1923 and continued until October 1926.

Andy Oberlander passed for 14 touchdowns and ran for 12. Dartmouth defeated Harvard, 32–9, its best victory to date over the Crimson. In a 62–13 victory over Cornell, Oberlander had 477 yards in total offense, including six touchdown passes, a Dartmouth record which still stands. He was responsible for some 500 yards of total offense. Cornell coach Gil Dobie responded "We won the game 13–0, passing is not football." The season closed with a 33–7 victory over defending Big Ten champion Chicago. Oberlander threw three touchdowns.

Schedule

Roster
The primary players at each position were:

Line

Source:

Backfield

Source:

References

Dartmouth
Dartmouth Big Green football seasons
College football national champions
College football undefeated seasons
Dartmouth Indians football